George John Kindel (March 2, 1855 –  February 28, 1930) was an American politician from Colorado who served one term in the United States House of Representatives from 1913 to 1915.

Biography
Born in Cincinnati, Ohio, Kindel attended the public schools and St. Augustine's School in Cincinnati.
Beginning in 1871, he apprentice as an upholsterer and mattress maker before relocating to Denver, Colorado in 1877. He worked throughout his career in the upholstery, mattress, and furniture business.

Political career
He served as a member of the board of supervisors of the city and county of Denver from 1910 to 1914.

In 1912, Kindel won election as a Democrat to the Sixty-third Congress, which convened from March 4, 1913 to March 3, 1915. In 1914, rather than seek re-election,  Kindel instead ran for the U.S. Senate, first as a Democratic candidate and then, after leaving the party, as an independent. In a field of five candidates, Kindel placed fifth, receiving 4.5% of the vote.

Death
After leaving Congress, he resumed his former business pursuits in Colorado.

He was in an automobile accident near Hillrose, Colorado, which resulted in his death in Brush, Colorado, on February 28, 1930. He was interred in Fairmount Cemetery, Denver, Colorado.

References

External links 
 

1855 births
1930 deaths
Members of the United States House of Representatives from Colorado
Colorado Democrats
Democratic Party members of the United States House of Representatives
Colorado Independents
Road incident deaths in Colorado
Politicians from Cincinnati
Politicians from Denver
20th-century American politicians